Chah Nahr (also Romanized as Chāh Nahr and Chāh-e Nahr; also known as Chāh Nar) is a village in Darz and Sayeban Rural District, in the Central District of Larestan County, Fars Province, Iran. At the 2006 census, its population was 1,137, in 244 families.

References 

Populated places in Larestan County